Terry LaVerne Stafford (November 22, 1941 – March 17, 1996) was an American singer and songwriter, best known for his 1964 US Top 10 hit "Suspicion", and the 1973 country music hit "Amarillo by Morning". Stafford was also known for his Elvis Presley sound-alike voice.

Early life
Born in Hollis, Oklahoma, he moved to Amarillo with his family at age seven, graduating from Palo Duro High School in 1960, and starring in basketball and football. After a stint singing with a local rockabilly group, he moved to California to pursue a musical career.

Music career
Originally cut as a demo, Stafford's version of the Elvis Presley song "Suspicion" was released on the Crusader record label and made it to no. 3 in the U.S. and no. 31 in the UK Singles Chart. "Suspicion" had the distinction of being sixth on the Billboard Hot 100 on April 4, 1964 when the Beatles held the top five spots. The following week, "Suspicion" peaked at no. 3, with the Beatles holding three of the top five spots. Stafford's recording sold over 1 million copies, and was awarded a gold disc by the RIAA. His follow-up "I’ll Touch a Star" rose to number 25 in United States. Both recordings were produced by Bob Summers (brother-in-law of Les Paul), who played all the instruments on the tracks as well as engineering and recording them, except for bass which was played by Ron Griffith. Summers released his own version in the 1970s, as well as a remake with Ed Greenwald on vocals in 2008.

In 1969, Buck Owens re-wrote Stafford's "Big in Dallas", recording it as "Big in Vegas". Owens' version peaked at no. 5 on the Billboard Hot Country Singles chart. and reached No. 1 on the RPM Country Tracks chart in Canada.

Stafford continued to record, but had no more hits. His 1973 release/joint composition "Amarillo by Morning" was covered by George Strait on Strait's 1982 album Strait from the Heart. The song was named "#12 country song of all-time" by Country Music Television.

Stafford lived most of his life between Los Angeles and Amarillo, Texas, and he died in Amarillo of liver failure at the age of 54. He is interred with his parents at Llano Cemetery in Amarillo.

There is a record of Nancy E. Hall marrying Terry L. Stafford on 20 May 1972 in Las Vegas, Nevada.

Death
Stafford died on March 17, 1996, after a lengthy illness.

Discography

Albums

Singles

References

External links

 Story by Amarillo DJ and Stafford friend Dick Shuey
 Terry Stafford Suspicion Home Page
 
 

1941 births
1996 deaths
People from Hollis, Oklahoma
Palo Duro High School alumni
Atlantic Records artists
American country singer-songwriters
Singer-songwriters from Oklahoma
American country rock singers
Musicians from Amarillo, Texas
Musicians from Los Angeles
Country musicians from Texas
Deaths from liver failure
20th-century American singers
Burials in Texas
Singer-songwriters from Texas
Singer-songwriters from California
Country musicians from California
Country musicians from Oklahoma